Chonocephalus is a genus of flies in the family Phoridae.

Species
C. aduncus Schmitz, 1928
C. alzadae Disney, 2008
C. americanus Borgmeier, 1963
C. anomalus Borgmeier & Prado, 1975
C. aripoensis Disney, 1995
C. assimilis Borgmeier & Prado, 1975
C. bentacaisei Santos Abreu & Schmitz, 1934
C. bispinosus Borgmeier, 1967
C. blackithorum Disney, 1986
C. brisbanensis Beyer, 1960
C. browni Disney, 2008
C. buccatus Malloch, 1912
C. cautus Disney, 2005
C. chiriquiensis Disney, 2008
C. collini Disney, 2002
C. comptoni Disney, 2008
C. cummingae Disney, 2005
C. dahli Schmitz, 1928
C. depressus Meijere, 1912
C. digitalis Borgmeier, 1967
C. dilatospinae Disney, 2008
C. dimakae Paulian, 1958
C. dimidiatus Borgmeier, 1967
C. dominicanus Borgmeier, 1967
C. dorsalis Wandolleck, 1898
C. ecitophilus Borgmeier & Schmitz, 1923
C. elongatus Schmitz, 1950
C. fletcheri Schmitz, 1912
C. furcatus Borgmeier, 1967
C. gilli Disney, 2008
C. globipygus Borgmeier, 1967
C. heymonsi Stobbe, 1913
C. hibisci Paulian, 1958
C. hirsutus Bohart, 1947
C. jamaicensis Brues, 1915
C. japonicus Schmitz, 1941
C. justini Disney, 2005
C. kiboshoensis Brues, 1907
C. kreuterae Disney, 2008
C. kungae Disney, 2008
C. laetus Borgmeier, 1963
C. leei Disney, 2008
C. longicornis Disney, 2008
C. macuiensis Disney, 2008
C. madagascariensis Paulian, 1958
C. major Schmitz, 1928
C. marginatus Disney, 2002
C. mexicanus Silvestri, 1911
C. modestus Disney, 2005
C. murallaensis Disney, 2008
C. necdepressus Disney, 2008
C. olanchoensis Disney, 2008
C. pallidulus Beyer, 1964
C. palposus Schmitz, 1928
C. pedalis Borgmeier, 1967
C. primus Schmitz, 1928
C. pudicus Disney, 2005
C. punctifascia Borgmeier, 1935
C. quartus Schmitz, 1928
C. raposoensis Disney, 2008
C. rostamani Disney, 2004
C. secundus Schmitz, 1928
C. similis Brues, 1905
C. simiolus Beyer, 1964
C. simplex Schmitz, 1928
C. steineri Disney, 2005
C. subglaber Bohart, 1947
C. tertius Schmitz, 1928
C. townesi Disney, 2008
C. vadoni Paulian, 1958
C. vitiodepressus Disney, 2008
C. wirthorum Disney, 1980

References

Phoridae
Platypezoidea genera